The secretary of state for defence is a secretary of state in the Government of the United Kingdom, with responsibility for the Ministry of Defence. As a senior minister, the incumbent is a member of the Cabinet of the United Kingdom.

The post of Secretary of State for Defence was created on 1 April 1964 replacing the positions of Minister of Defence, First Lord of the Admiralty, Secretary of State for War and Secretary of State for Air, while the individual offices of the British Armed Forces were abolished and their functions transferred to the Ministry of Defence. In 1997, Michael Portillo was filling this post at the time of the Portillo moment. In 2019, Penny Mordaunt became the UK's first female defence secretary.

The secretary is supported by the other ministers in the Defence Ministerial team and the MOD permanent secretary. The corresponding shadow minister is the shadow secretary of state for defence, and the secretary of state is also scrutinised by the Defence Select Committee.

The current secretary of state for defence is Ben Wallace MP, since his appointment by Prime Minister Boris Johnson in July 2019. He was reappointed by Prime Minister Liz Truss in September 2022, and again by Prime Minister Rishi Sunak in October 2022.

Responsibilities
Corresponding to what is generally known as a defence minister in many other countries, the Defence Secretary's remit includes:
Strategic military and defensive operations. The postholder is a member of the National Security Council, and chair of the Defence Council, to which the monarch has given the power to command the Armed Forces.
Oversight of Defence Intelligence 
Relations with international partnerships, including NATO
Defence policy (Trident nuclear weapons programme), resourcing and planning
Communications on defence

History

Minister for Co-ordination of Defence (1936–1940)

The position of Minister for Co-ordination of Defence was a British Cabinet-level position established in 1936 to oversee and co-ordinate the rearmament of Britain's defences. It was established by the Prime Minister, Stanley Baldwin in response to criticism that Britain's armed forces were understrength compared to those of Nazi Germany. When the Second World War broke out, the new Prime Minister Neville Chamberlain formed a small War Cabinet and it was expected that the Minister would serve as a spokesperson for the three service ministers, the Secretary of State for War, the First Lord of the Admiralty and the Secretary of State for Air; however, political considerations resulted in all three posts being included in the Cabinet, and this role proved increasingly redundant. In April 1940 the position was formally wound up and the functions transferred to other Ministers.

Minister of Defence (1940–1964)

The post of Minister of Defence was responsible for co-ordination of defence and security from its creation in 1940 until its abolition in 1964. The post was a Cabinet level post and generally ranked above the three service ministers, some of whom, however, continued to also serve in Cabinet.

On his appointment as Prime Minister in May 1940, Winston Churchill created for himself the new post of Minister of Defence. The post was created in response to previous criticism that there had been no clear single minister in charge of the prosecution of World War II. In 1946, the post became the only cabinet-level post representing the military, with the three service ministers – the Secretary of State for War, the First Lord of the Admiralty, and the Secretary of State for Air, now formally subordinated to the Minister of Defence.

Secretary of State for Defence (1964–present)
The post was created in 1964 as successor to the posts of Minister for Coordination of Defence and Minister of Defence. It replaced the positions of First Lord of the Admiralty, Secretary of State for War and Secretary of State for Air, as the Admiralty, War Office and Air Ministry were merged into the Ministry of Defence (the Secretary of State for War had already ceased to be a cabinet position in 1946, with the creation of the cabinet-level Minister of Defence).

Secretaries of State for Defence (1964–present)

* Incumbent's length of term last updated: .

References

External links

 www.gov.uk/mod

Defence, Secretary of State for
Ministry of Defence (United Kingdom)
 
Ministerial offices in the United Kingdom
1964 establishments in the United Kingdom
United Kingdom